Alban Beqiri (born 28 June 1994) is an Albanian boxer. He participated at the 2021 AIBA World Boxing Championships, being awarded the bronze medal in the light middleweight event. Beqiri was the first and only person of his country to win a medal.

References

External links 

1994 births
Living people
Place of birth missing (living people)
Albanian male boxers
Light-middleweight boxers
AIBA World Boxing Championships medalists
20th-century Albanian people
21st-century Albanian people
European Games competitors for Albania
Boxers at the 2015 European Games
Boxers at the 2019 European Games
Mediterranean Games competitors for Albania
Competitors at the 2022 Mediterranean Games